Kian Slor (born 23 March 2002) is a Dutch professional footballer who plays as a forward for Groningen.

Professional career
On 17 January 2020, Slor signed his first professional contract with FC Groningen for 2.5 years. Slor made his professional debut with Groningen in a 1-0 Eredivisie loss to PEC Zwolle on 1 February 2020.

On 31 August 2021, Slor joined Emmen on loan for the 2021–22 season alongside fellow Groningen-player Joël van Kaam.

References

External links
 

2002 births
Living people
Footballers from Groningen (province)
Dutch footballers
Association football forwards
FC Groningen players
FC Emmen players
Eredivisie players
Eerste Divisie players